"Wasteland" is the fourth single from Needtobreathe's fifth studio album, Rivers in the Wasteland. It was released on April 1, 2014, by Atlantic Records, Word Records and Curb Records in anticipation of the album's release, and the song were written by Bear and Bo Rinehart and Mark Savage. On May 3, 2014, the band performed the song "Wasteland" on CBS This Morning: Saturday. The song was sent to Christian AC radio stations on September 22, 2015.

Track listing

Weekly Charts

References 

2014 singles
2014 songs
Needtobreathe songs
Atlantic Records singles
Curb Records singles